Eferi is a village in the commune of Djanet, in Djanet District, Illizi Province, Algeria. Along with the other localities near Djanet it lies at the south-western edge of the Tassili n'Ajjer mountain range.

References

Neighbouring towns and cities

Populated places in Illizi Province